Coryphellina arveloi is a species of sea slug, an aeolid nudibranch, a marine  gastropod mollusc in the family Flabellinidae.

Distribution
This species was described from the island of Boa Vista, Cape Verde, Africa.

See also
Flabellina marcusorum, a similar species

References

Flabellinidae
Gastropods described in 1998
Gastropods of Cape Verde
Fauna of Boa Vista, Cape Verde